Stuart Turner may refer to:

Stuart Turner (baseball) (born 1991), American baseball player
Stuart Turner (cricketer) (born 1943), English cricketer
Stuart Turner (engineer) (1869–1920), English engineer
Stuart Turner (musician), English alternative blues singer
Stuart Turner (rugby union) (born 1972), rugby union player
Stuart Turner (EastEnders), a fictional character
Stuart Turner (The Bill), a fictional character
Stuart Turner (company), British engineering company founded in 1906